Miwa Oshiro (大城 美和, born August 26, 1983) is a Japanese gravure idol and actress.

Biography
Oshiro was born in Sapporo, Hokkaido, Japan on August 26, 1983 to an Okinawan father and mother from Hokkaido. She is best known for her appearances in films "Eiken" and "Hunabku".

DVD Filmography
 Maui Densetsu (2001)
 Crazy for mie? (2001)
 Tele Tesa Angel Eye - Private Resort (2002)
 Final Beauty (2002)
 D-Splash! (2002)
 Treasure Vol 13 (2003)
 Miwa In Hawaii (2003)
 Cover Girls (2003)
 Nishojo Tanteidan - Asuka Kara No Kaze (2003)
 Miwa Oshiro -SuperCharge- (2003)
 Idol One: Perfume (2003)
 Se-Jo! Series A: Miwa Oshiro (2004)
 Silky Collection Se-Jo! 2 B (2004)
 Beach Angels - Miwa Oshiro in Belau (2004)
 A Day Off (2005)
 Tukkataa (2006)

See also
 Rio Natsume

External links
Official Blog
Former Official Blog

Japanese gravure idols
Japanese television personalities
People from Sapporo
1983 births
Living people